Druid's Blood is a novel by Esther M. Friesner published by Signet Books in 1988.

Plot summary
Druid's Blood is a novel that takes place in a Victorian England based on the notion that druidic and other forms of Celtic magic drove off the Romans, and a line of magical royalty has preserved the power ever since.

Reception
J. Michael Caparula reviewed Druid's Blood in Space Gamer/Fantasy Gamer No. 85. Caparula commented that "the writing is beautifully fluid and there is ample humor and plenty of in-jokes for the dedicated Sherlockian. A fair but promising novel."

Reviews
Review by Tom Whitmore (1988) in Locus, #330 July 1988 
Review by Algis Budrys (1988) in The Magazine of Fantasy & Science Fiction, November 1988 
Review by Baird Searles (1989) in Isaac Asimov's Science Fiction Magazine, January 1989 
Review by Wendy Bradley (1990) in Interzone, #35 May 1990
Kliatt

References

1988 American novels
Signet Books books